The Highest Honour is a 1982 Australian/Japanese co-production about Operation Jaywick and Operation Rimau by Z Special Unit during World War II.

The same story inspired the TV mini-series Heroes (1988) and Heroes II: The Return (1991).

Plot
During World War II, a team of Australian soldiers from Z Special Unit, including Ivan Lyon and Robert Page, successfully lead an expedition to destroy ships in Singapore harbour, Operation Jaywick. An attempt to duplicate this success, Operation Rimau, ends in disaster, with the team either killed or captured. These soldiers are interrogated by the Japanese in Singapore, with Page forming a friendship with Minoru Tamiya. Eventually all the Australians are convicted of war crimes and executed.

Cast

John Howard as Capt. Robert Page
Atsuo Nakamura as Minoru Tamiya
Stuart Wilson as Lt. Col. Ivan Lyon
Steve Bisley as A.B. W.G. Falls
Michael Aitkens as Major Ingleton
George Mallaby as Lt. Cmdr. Don Davidson
Tony Bonner as Lt. W.G. Carey
John Ley as Lt. A.I. Sargent
Harold Hopkins as Cpl. C.M. Stewart
Garry Waddell as Cpl. R.B. Fletcher
Slim DeGrey as Leading Stoker J.P. McDowell
Alan Cassell as Lt. Ted Carse
Mark Hembrow as Able Seaman F.W. Marsh
Vincent Ball as Lt. Cmdr. Hubert Marsham
Craig Ballard as Lt. B. Raymond
James Belton as Lt. H.R. Ross
Warren Coleman as Leading Seaman K.P. Cain
Diane Craig as Mrs. Page
George Duff as Cpl. A.G. Campbell
Tim Elston as Sgt. D.P. Gooley
Takuya Fujioka as Matsumoto
Ken Goodlet as Bill Reynolds
John Griffiths as Sgt. C.B. Cameron
Riki Harada as Sgt. Imai
Michael Harrs as Lt Cpl. J.T. Hardy
Noel Hodda as Able Seaman M.M. Berryman
Andrew Inglis as Able Seaman A.M. Jones
Kin'ya Kitaōji as Tachibana
Hôsei Komatsu as Yabe
Hitomi Kuroki as Nurse Keiko Tsumura
Veronica Lang as Mrs. Lyon
Hu Yin Mong as Lu Ran Shi
Yû Numazaki as Capt. Nomura
Neil Redfern as WO2 A. Warren
Jiro Sakagami as Kimura
Taro Shigaki as Hayakawa
Trevor Sommers as Sub. Lt. J.G. Riggs
Mizuho Suzuki as Maj. Gen. Kawamura
Jonathan Sweey as Cpl. A. Crilley
Hajime Tawara as Sgt. Maj. Omori

Production
Producers John McCallum and Lee Robinson had previously made a film about Z Special Unit, Attack Force Z (1981). Robinson said he was approached to make the film by a member of the Australian embassy in Tokyo in 1980. He says the official asked him if he was interested in making a movie about Jaywick and Rimau with a Japanese company. Robinson says he spent a year researching the story in Japanese and Australian archives.

The film was originally shot under the title of Southern Cross. Production took place in 1982. It was financed by two dozen Australian businessmen and a Japanese production company, Shinihon Eija, who contributed $1.5 million in marketing and production costs.

There were two versions of the film – Australian and Japanese. Robinson later said the two versions were intrinsically the same but the emphasis in the Japanese film was more towards the Japanese actors and vice versa.

Robinson later said that "the film is a human story of how a friendship can develop among enemies and how human spirit rises above the atrocities of war. It is an anti-war film set in a period remembered for horrendous slayings of civilians."

Release
The film was never released theatrically in Australia but did screen as a TV mini-series in 1989. It did obtain a theatrical release in the US and UK and McCallum says the film sold widely to television. It was also known as Heroes of the Krait and Minami Jujisei.

The widow of Bob Page and survivors of Z Force were furious with the film, claiming it was far too complimentary to the Japanese. Robinson admitted the film was "50 percent fiction" and that "there is no doubt that the whole picture is designed as an apology, but with facts as dramatic as these, why play around with it? What gives the film the impact is the constant reminder that this is true."

Robinson admitted there was an occasion when the Japanese producers wanted the prison set to have pillows and sheets on the bed to make them look nicer, but he refused. A scene where a Japanese officer comes to Australia ten years after the war to make peace with one of the widows, Roma Greemish, was cut at the request of Ms Greemish.

McCallum later said that "Stuart Wilson was very good in" the film but:
It got bogged down with too much Japanese dialogue, because they were co-producing, and put up half the money. They insisted on a lot of Japanese. I said, 'You're the villains in this, you beheaded the Australians.' But they thought they'd make a huge amount of money out of it; the man behind the film company was a millionaire. He took us up there, Robinson and myself and some of the actors, and we had a great jamboree of a week in Tokyo, where he had a huge launch of the damn thing in a huge cinema. He said 'We're releasing it tomorrow all over Japan. We expect to make three million.' I think they lost three million.
In 1982 Thomas Keneally was reported as working on a script for another film based on Operation Rimau called Rimau for the South Australian Film Corporation to be made for $1 million, but no film eventuated.

References

External links

1982 films
1980s English-language films
Pacific War films
Films set in Singapore
Films shot in Singapore
Australia–Japan relations
1980s war films
Australian World War II films
Japanese World War II films
Films directed by Peter Maxwell
1980s Japanese films